Prophet Without Honor is a 1939 short documentary film directed by Felix E. Feist. At the 12th Academy Awards, held in 1940, it was nominated for an Academy Award for Best Live Action Short Film, One-Reel. The documentary is about Matthew Fontaine Maury, a U.S. naval officer who created the first maps that charted the oceans' winds and currents.

Cast
 Carey Wilson as Narrator
 Tom Neal as Matthew Fontaine Maury (uncredited)

References

External links

 Prophet Without Honor

1939 documentary films
1939 films
American short documentary films
Documentary films about the history of science
Films directed by Felix E. Feist
American black-and-white films
Metro-Goldwyn-Mayer short films
Black-and-white documentary films
1930s short documentary films
Documentary films about water transport
History of cartography
1930s English-language films
1930s American films